Caydee Christine Denney (born June 22, 1993) is an American former competitive pair skater. With John Coughlin, she is the 2012 Four Continents silver medalist and 2012 U.S. national champion. With former partner Jeremy Barrett, Denney is the 2010 U.S. national champion. During the pairs short program at the 2010 Olympics, Denney and Barrett became the first team to land a throw triple Lutz jump at any Winter Olympic competition.

Personal life 
Caydee Denney was born in Ocala, Florida. She is the elder sister of American pair skater Haven Denney. Their parents, DeeDee and Bryan Denney, both competed in artistic roller skating.

Career 
Denney also competed as a single skater until 2009.

Partnership with Barrett 
Denney and Barrett first began skating together in 2006, but the partnership did not last. They teamed up again in 2008 and began competing in the 2008-09 season. Based on their good performance during the summer non-qualifying competitions, Denney and Barrett were assigned to the 2008 Nebelhorn Trophy, where they placed 4th. They won the 2009 Eastern Sectionals to qualify for the national championships.

Denney/Barrett won the silver medal at the 2009 U.S. Nationals. They placed sixth at the 2009 Four Continents. The following season they won the U.S. national title and the right to compete at the Olympics, where they finished 13th. During the pairs short program at the 2010 Olympics, they became the first team to land a throw triple Lutz jump at any Winter Olympic competition. They placed 7th at the 2010 World Championships.

At the 2011 U.S. Nationals, they won the bronze medal and were assigned to compete at Four Continents, however they were forced to withdraw; Denney accidentally sliced Barrett's calf on his right leg while practicing side-by-side jumps.

Denney and Barrett ended their partnership in February 2011.

Partnership with Coughlin

2011–2012 season 
On May 17, 2011, Denney announced that she had teamed up with John Coughlin. They train under coach Dalilah Sappenfield at the Broadmoor Skating Club in Colorado Springs, Colorado, Denney having relocated from Wesley Chapel, Florida after splitting from her previous partner. Denney and Coughlin have a height difference of 14 inches (36 cm). They made their competitive debut at the Liberty Summer competition in July 2011, winning the short program. At the Nebelhorn Trophy they won the bronze medal. They were assigned to the 2011 Skate America and 2011 NHK Trophy, where they placed fourth and fifth respectively.

Denney/Coughlin went on to win the 2012 US Championships and were assigned to Four Continents and Worlds. They won the silver medal at the 2012 Four Continents and then placed eighth at 2012 Worlds.

2012–2013 season 
Denney/Coughlin made their season debut at the 2012 Nebelhorn Trophy, winning the silver medal. They won bronze medals at both of their Grand Prix assignments, the 2012 Skate America and the 2012 Rostelecom Cup. On December 4, 2012, Coughlin underwent surgery to repair a torn labrum in his left hip. As a result, the pair missed the 2013 U.S. Championships but they submitted a petition to be considered for the U.S. team to the 2013 World Championships. They were named in the U.S. team to the event but decided not to compete. Coughlin was off the ice for about nine weeks.

2013–2014 season 
Denney/Coughlin won silver at the 2013 U.S. Classic, placed fourth at the 2013 Skate America, and won bronze at the 2013 Trophée Eric Bompard. They took the bronze medal at the 2014 U.S. Championships, finishing behind champions Marissa Castelli / Simon Shnapir and silver medalists Felicia Zhang / Nathan Bartholomay, whose total score was greater by 0.29 of a point. Denney/Coughlin did not receive one of the two American spots in the pairs' event at the 2014 Winter Olympics but were assigned to the 2014 World Championships. They withdrew due to Denney's right ankle injury, sustained in practice on March 19. Denney was expected to return to training after eight to twelve weeks. In June 2014, the pair stated they would not compete in the 2014–15 season.

Programs

With Coughlin

With Barrett

Competitive highlights

Pairs career with Coughlin

Pairs career with Barrett

Singles career

References

External links 

 
 
 
 Caydee Denney / Jeremy Barrett at Tracings.net

American female pair skaters
American female single skaters
1993 births
Living people
Sportspeople from Ocala, Florida
Figure skaters at the 2010 Winter Olympics
Olympic figure skaters of the United States
Four Continents Figure Skating Championships medalists
21st-century American women
20th-century American women